Aces Wild is a 1936 American Western film directed by Harry L. Fraser and starring Harry Carey, Gertrude Messinger and Theodore Lorch.

Main cast
 Harry Carey as Cheyenne Harry Morgan  
 Gertrude Messinger as Martha Worth  
 Theodore Lorch as Kelton 
 Roger Williams as Slim - Henchman  
 Chuck Morrison as Hank - Henchman  
 Phil Dunham as Anson - Editor  
 Fred 'Snowflake' Toones as  Snowflake

References

Bibliography
 Pitts, Michael R. Poverty Row Studios, 1929–1940: An Illustrated History of 55 Independent Film Companies, with a Filmography for Each. McFarland & Company, 2005.

External links
 

1936 films
1936 Western (genre) films
American Western (genre) films
American black-and-white films
Commodore Pictures films
1930s English-language films
Films directed by Harry L. Fraser
Films with screenplays by Harry L. Fraser
1930s American films